The Hôtel de Grimaldi-Régusse is a listed hôtel particulier in the Aix-en-Provence of France.

Location
It is located at 26, rue de l'Opéra in Aix-en-Provence, in the Villeneuve quarter.

History
It was designed by architects Pierre Puget (1620-1694) and Thomas Veyrier for Charles de Grimaldi-Régusse (1612-1687) in 1680. The facade was designed by architect Laurent Vallon (1652-1724). The ceiling in a drawing-room was painted by Sébastien Barras (1653-1703). The main door is sculpted with designs of lions surrounded by foliage.

Heritage significance
It has been listed as a monument historique since 21 February 1973.

References

Hôtels particuliers in Aix-en-Provence
Monuments historiques of Aix-en-Provence
Houses completed in 1680
1680 establishments in France